Cryptocephalus quadruplex is a species of case-bearing leaf beetle in the family Chrysomelidae. It is found in North America.

Case-bearing leaf beetles are named so because the larvae construct protective cases from their fecal matter and sometimes plant debris.

References

Further reading

External links

 

quadruplex
Articles created by Qbugbot
Beetles described in 1841